The 1995 Missouri Valley Conference men's basketball tournament was played after the conclusion of the 1994–1995 regular season at the Kiel Center in St. Louis, Missouri.

The  defeated the Tulsa Golden Hurricane in the championship game, 77–62, and as a result won their 4th MVC Tournament title and earned an automatic bid to the 1995 NCAA tournament. Chris Carr of Southern Illinois was named the tournament MVP.

Bracket

References

1994–95 Missouri Valley Conference men's basketball season
Missouri Valley Conference men's basketball tournament
Missouri Valley Conference men's basketball tournament
College basketball tournaments in Missouri
Basketball competitions in St. Louis